Baldwin ministry may refer to:

 First Baldwin ministry, the British majority (later caretaker) government led by Stanley Baldwin from 1923 to 1924
 Second Baldwin ministry, the British majority (later caretaker) government led by Stanley Baldwin from 1924 to 1929
 Third Baldwin ministry, the British coalition government led by Stanley Baldwin from June to November 1935
 Fourth Baldwin ministry, the British coalition government led by Stanley Baldwin from November 1935 to 1937

See also
 National Government (United Kingdom)